Lönneberga is a village and parish in Hultsfred Municipality in the Swedish county of Kalmar County  in the region of Småland. In 2000 the parish had 1323 inhabitants on 94 square kilometers, of which 190 lived  in the village.

Lönneberga is mostly known from the children's books by Astrid Lindgren about Emil i Lönneberga. It is also the birthplace of artist and writer Albert Engström.

References

External links
Official site

Populated places in Kalmar County